Šime Gregov (born 8 July 1989) is a Croatian footballer who currently plays for Italian club Varesina Calcio.

Club career
Gregov started his professional career with local Zadar in 2007.

He later transferred to Hrvatski Dragovoljac, where he would stay for three years. In the 2012-13 season Gregov and Hrvatski Dragovoljac finished first and were promoted to the 1. HNL. The following season they got relegated, and Gregov left the club to join Istra 1961.

After spending the last two seasons with PrvaLiga sides Krško and Koper, Gregov signed for Norwegian club Viking 4 July 2017.

On 30 January 2018, Gregov joined Tractor. On 20 July 2018, Gregov returned to NK Krško. But only 1,5-months later, he joined NK Kurilovec on 18 September. He left the club at the end of 2018 and joined Hrvatski Dragovoljac.

In the summer 2019, Gregov moved abroad and joined Italian Serie D club U.S.D. 1913 Seregno Calcio.

Career statistics

References

1989 births
Living people
Sportspeople from Zadar
Association football central defenders
Croatian footballers
NK Zadar players
NK Hrvatski Dragovoljac players
NK Istra 1961 players
NK Krško players
FC Koper players
Viking FK players
Tractor S.C. players
U.S. 1913 Seregno Calcio players
First Football League (Croatia) players
Croatian Football League players
Slovenian PrvaLiga players
Eliteserien players
Persian Gulf Pro League players
Serie D players
Croatian expatriate footballers
Croatian expatriate sportspeople in Slovenia
Expatriate footballers in Slovenia
Croatian expatriate sportspeople in Norway
Expatriate footballers in Norway
Croatian expatriate sportspeople in Iran
Expatriate footballers in Iran
Croatian expatriate sportspeople in Italy
Expatriate footballers in Italy